Svätý Peter ( or Komáromszentpéter) is a village and municipality in the Komárno District in the Nitra Region of southwest Slovakia.

Geography
The village lies at an altitude of 138 metres and covers an area of 34.327 km2.
It has a population of about 2610 people.

History
In the 9th century, the territory of Svätý Peter became part of the Kingdom of Hungary. In historical records the village was first mentioned in 1332.
After the Austro-Hungarian army disintegrated in November 1918, Czechoslovak troops occupied the area, later acknowledged internationally by the Treaty of Trianon. Between 1938 and 1945 Svätý Peter once more  became part of Miklós Horthy's Hungary through the First Vienna Award. From 1945 until the Velvet Divorce, it was part of Czechoslovakia. Since then it has been part of Slovakia.

Ethnicity
The village is about 74% Magyar, 26% Slovak.

Facilities
The village has a public library, a gym and a  football pitch.

References

External links
http://www.statistics.sk/mosmis/eng/run.html

Villages and municipalities in the Komárno District
Hungarian communities in Slovakia